Alto is a comune (municipality) in the province of Cuneo in the northern Italian region Piedmont, located about  south of Turin and about  southeast of Cuneo.

Alto borders the following municipalities: Aquila di Arroscia, Caprauna, Nasino, and Ormea.

References

Cities and towns in Piedmont
Articles which contain graphical timelines